Yeoval is a small village in the Central Western district of New South Wales, Australia.  The town lies in Cabonne Shire.  However, a small part lies over Buckinbah Creek in Wellington Shire which is referred to as North Yeoval. Yeoval is located between Dubbo and Orange. At the 2016 census, Yeoval had a population of 430. The town was the childhood home of Australian poet Banjo Paterson, who lived on the nearby Buckinbah property, and many of his poems reflect the area. A Banjo Paterson Museum is open to visitors.

History
Yeoval a village in the Central West of New South Wales, centrally located between Orange, Dubbo, Parkes and Wellington.

In 1868, gold, silver and copper were discovered 7 km from Yeoval. The Goodrich Mine operated in this area periodically until 1971.

Yeoval Post Office opened on 1 November 1884.

Yeoval railway station opened in 1925 on the now closed Molong–Dubbo railway line, and was sited to the north of the village in North Yeoval. Passenger services operated until 1974.

Population
In the 2016 Census, there were 430 people in Yeoval. 84.7% of people were born in Australia and 91.6% of people spoke only English at home. The most common responses for religion was Catholic at 26.3%.

Schools
 Yeoval Central School
The school caters for students from kindergarten to year 12 and has been open for over 125 years. There are 35 HSC courses available to senior students.

 St Columba's Catholic School
This small 25-student school is situated opposite the Catholic Church and adjacent to the original convent building.

 Yeoval Pre-School
This is a small community-based pre-school.

Public Sculptures and Museums 
Banjo Paterson Bush Park alongside Buckinbah Creek at the junction of Forbes St, Molong St and Renshaw McGirr Way is home to several interesting sculptures.

A giant sculpture of Banjo Paterson's hat is situated in the park. Originally used as a real estate marketing tool, it was donated by the former owner and Orange councillor Chris Gryllis in February 2017.

The park is also home to a 6 metre high, six tonne abstract artwork depicting prolific sculptor Henry Moore created by his protégé Drago Marin Cherina.

The Banjo Paterson... More Than a Poet Cafe and Museum houses a collection of handwritten letters, unpublished poems, photos, stories, editorials and other memorabilia of the era which tell the story of the poet's life.

Churches
 St Luke's Anglican Church (closed in 2014)
 Yeoval Baptist Church
 Church of Our Lady
 Yeoval Uniting Church

Gallery

References

External links
 Wellington-NSW:Yeoval

Towns in the Central West (New South Wales)
Geography of New South Wales
Central West (New South Wales)
Cabonne Council
Mining towns in New South Wales